Roman language may refer to:

 Latin, the language of Ancient Rome 
 Romaic, the language of the Byzantine Empire
 Languages of the Roman Empire
 Romance languages, the languages descended from Latin, including French, Spanish and Italian
 Romanesco dialect, the variety of Italian spoken in the area of Rome

See also 
 Romang language, a language of Indonesia
 Romani language, the language of the Romani people
 Romanian language, the language of Romania
 Romansh language, an official language of Switzerland